The 1993–94 Combined Counties Football League season was the 16th in the history of the Combined Counties Football League, a football competition in England.

The league was won by Peppard for the second time, successfully defending their championship win the previous season.

League table

The league was increased from 19 clubs to 21 after Steyning Town joined the Sussex County League, and three new clubs joined:
Eton Wick, joining from the Chiltonian League.
Farnham Town, rejoining from the Isthmian League after one season. They resigned before the start of the previous season due to ground grading and financial problems, but had been too late to rejoin the Combined Counties League in readiness for that season.
Virginia Water, joining from the Surrey County Premier League. They had previously been members of the Combined Counties League, having left in 1987.

References

External links
 Combined Counties League Official Site

1993-94
1993–94 in English football leagues